The 2018 Intermediate League World Series took place from July 29–August 5 in Livermore, California. Seoul, South Korea defeated host Livermore, California in the championship game.

The debut of the Australia Region raised the total number of teams to 12.

Teams

Results

United States Bracket

International Bracket

Consolation Round

Elimination Round

References

Intermediate League World Series
Intermediate League World Series